SARMOTI is an acronym for "Siegfried And Roy, Masters Of The Impossible". It may refer to:

Siegfried & Roy, entertainers, who used "SARMOTI" as a magic word
College of Magic#The SARMOTI Grant
Sarmoti, a fictional lion in Father of the Pride
Sarmoti, the real-life Siegfried & Roy lion whom the fictional lion represents